RBC Dominion Securities was the brand used by Royal Bank of Canada for full service brokerage services, primarily in Canada, and formed part of RBC's Wealth Management and Capital Markets divisions. Today, RBC Dominion Securities is known as RBC Capital Markets  and RBC Wealth Management.

History

Dominion Securities was established in Toronto, Ontario, Canada on the 18th of March, 1901 as Dominion Securities Corporation Limited. Its founders, Senator George Albertus Cox and Edward Rogers Wood, were both well known Canadian business figures at the time, having previously formed the National Trust Company together in 1898. The firm originally focused on the underwriting and new issue of government and municipal bonds but diversified into war bonds during World War I and into equity securities in later years. At the time of incorporation, DS was located at 26 King Street East in Toronto.

By 1958, the firm had developed a large network of branches including locations in every major Canadian city as well as international offices in New York, Boston, Philadelphia, and London. The late 1950s saw Dominion Securities fully involved in the trading of securities on the secondary markets as members of The Toronto, Montreal, Winnipeg, and Canadian Stock Exchanges, as well as affiliate members of the American Stock Exchange. They also had access to the NYSE and numerous other exchanges at the time. During this period, DS maintained a head office at 50 King Street West in Toronto and was headed by President G.E. Phipps, Chairman G.P. Rutherford, and Vice-chairman, H. N. Bawden.

The firm grew through acquisitions and itself was gradually acquired by Royal Bank of Canada where it became the corporate and investment banking subsidiary of the bank holding company.

In 2000, the investment banking subsidiary rebranded itself from RBC Dominion Securities to RBC Capital Markets. However the Dominion Securities brand is still used today; RBC Dominion Securities Inc is the legal name of the company from which the full service brokerage activities operate.  In addition, RBC Dominion Securities is the broker dealer subsidiary used by RBC Capital Markets in Canada.

Other previously independent investment banks (including corporate banking and full service brokerage) which were also acquired by a Big Five Bank underwent a similar restructuring. BMO Nesbitt Burns, CIBC Wood Gundy, and McLeod Young Weir Ltd., were all rebranded to BMO Capital Markets, CIBC World Markets, and Scotia Capital, respectively, but their bank holding company parent still use the old names as a brand for their full service brokerage under wealth management, plus the old name still remains the broker dealer subsidiary for their investment bank in Canada.

Timeline
 1984 acquires Pitfield, Mackay, Ross Limited
 1988 Royal Bank acquires 67% stake in Dominion Securities
 1989 acquires Pemberton Willoughby Investment Corporation
 1996 acquires Richardson Greenshields of Canada Limited
 1996 RBC acquires 100% stake
 2001 acquires US-based Dain Rauscher and Tucker Anthony Sutro & Company

See also

 James Henry Gundy and George Herbert Wood - former Dominion Securities brokers left in 1905 form Wood Gundy

References

External links 
RBC Dominion Securities

Stock brokerages and investment banks of Canada
Royal Bank of Canada